Schlachtgeschwader 77 (SG 77) was a Luftwaffe close air support Geschwader during World War II. It was formed on 18 October 1943 in Wassilkow from Stab/Sturzkampfgeschwader 77. With the exception of II. Group, which was redesignated as III. Group, Schlachtgeschwader 10, the remaining groups were renamed to Schlachtgeschwader 77. On 3 March 1945, 9. Staffel equipped its Fw 190F-8s with Panzerblitz 80 mm anti-tank rockets. Adapted from the R4M rocket, these were carried under the outboard wings.

On 17 April 1945 Stab and III./SG 77 were based at Kamenz, north-east of Dresden. A formation of P-51s of the 55th Fighter Group spotted SG 77's aircraft preparing to take-off. 116-kill 'ace' Oberleutnant August Lambert and two other pilots were taking off when the American fighters appeared. The Fw 190s jettisoned their bombs and tried to escape but all three were shot down, Lambert being killed in his Fw 190 F-8 'Black 9 + ' north of Hoyerswerda. Seven other Fw 190s were destroyed or badly damaged on the ground at Kamenz by the P-51s.

Commanding officers

Major Helmut Bruck, 18 October 1943 – 15 February 1945
Obstleutnant Manfred Mossinger, 16 February 1945 – 8 May 1945

References

Luftwaffe Wings
Military units and formations established in 1943
Military units and formations disestablished in 1945